The 2013–14 NIFL Championship (known as the Belfast Telegraph Championship for sponsorship reasons) was the sixth season since its establishment after a major overhaul of the league system in Northern Ireland. This was the first season that the league was operated by the Northern Ireland Football League (NIFL), which took over from the Irish Football Association (IFA) for the 2013–14 season onwards.  The season began on 9 August 2013 and ended on 10 May 2014.

Institute won the Championship 1 title, winning promotion back to the top flight for the first time since the 2009–10 season. In the bottom two, Limavady United and Coagh United were relegated to Championship 2. Armagh City and PSNI replaced them in Championship 1, after finishing first and second in Championship 2. For the first time since the Championship was inaugurated in 2008, a club was relegated to regional football. Killymoon Rangers finished bottom of Championship 2 and were relegated to a regional division for the following season. Also leaving Championship 2 was Chimney Corner. In July 2014, the club announced that they would be resigning from the Championship to join the Ballymena & Provincial League for the following season.

Team changes from 2012–13
Ards were last season's winners of Championship 1, achieving promotion to the 2013–14 NIFL Premiership. Lisburn Distillery replaced them for this season's Championship 1, after finishing in 12th place in the previous season's Premiership. Championship 1 runners-up Warrenpoint Town were also promoted, by defeating Donegal Celtic on the away goals rule after the promotion/relegation play-off ended 2–2 on aggregate.

As a result of Newry City's expulsion the previous season, only the 13th-placed club, Tobermore United, were relegated to Championship 2. Championship 2 winners Knockbreda and runners-up Ballyclare Comrades were both promoted to Championship 1. The last remaining place in Championship 2 was filled by the winner of a two-legged promotion play-off between Mid-Ulster Football League champions Dollingstown and Northern Amateur Football League champions Newington YC. Newington YC won the play-off on the away goals rule after the tie ended 4–4 on aggregate, to gain promotion to Championship 2 for the first time.

Promoted from Championship 1 to the Premiership
 Ards (1st in Championship 1)
 Warrenpoint Town (2nd in Championship 1 - play-off winners)

Relegated from the Premiership to Championship 1
 Donegal Celtic (11th in IFA Premiership - play-off losers)
 Lisburn Distillery (12th in IFA Premiership)

Promoted from Championship 2 to Championship 1
 Knockbreda (1st in Championship 2)
 Ballyclare Comrades (2nd in Championship 2)

Relegated from Championship 1 to Championship 2
 Tobermore United (13th in Championship 1)

Promoted from Northern Amateur Football League to Championship 2
 Newington YC (1st in NAFL Premier Division - promoted via play-off)

Championship 1

Stadia and locations

League table

Results
Each team will play every other team twice (once at home, and once away) for a total of 26 games.

Championship 2

Stadia and locations

League table

Results
Each team plays every other team twice (once at home, and once away) for a total of 30 games.

References

2013-14
North
2